Maneater may refer to:
 Man-eater, a carnivorous animal that has developed a taste for human flesh
 Femme fatale, an attractive woman who leads men on but does not care for them

Music
 "Maneater" (Hall & Oates song), a 1982 single by Daryl Hall and John Oates
 "Maneater" (Nelly Furtado song), a 2006 single by Nelly Furtado

Film and television
 Shark! (film) ( Maneater), a 1969 film with Burt Reynolds
 The Man-Eater (film) (a.k.a. Maneater), a 1999 film
 Maneater (2007 film), a 2007 film
 Maneater (2009 film), a 2009 film
 Maneater (film series), a series of natural horror films produced by RHI Entertainment
 Maneater (miniseries), a miniseries that aired on Lifetime on May 30 and May 31, 2009
 "Maneater" (Eureka), an episode of Eureka
 Mangeuses d'Hommes, a cult 1988 French-language sex-comedy/horror film

Video game
 Maneater (video game), a 2020 video game published by Tripwire Interactive

Print media
 Maneater (novel), a 2008 novel by Thomas Emson
 The Maneater, student newspaper of the University of Missouri
 An alternative title of the 1980 Italian film The Anthropophagous Beast
 Man-Eaters comicbook series, by Chelsea Cain, Kate Niemczyk, and Lia Miternique

Other
 A type of ogre in Warhammer Age of Sigmar
 A boss character from the Castlevania, video game series